Ceair may refer to the following places in Romania:

 Ceair (Almălău), a tributary of the Almălău in Constanța County
 Ceair (Urluia), a tributary of the Urluia in Constanța County
 Ceairu, a village in Topliceni Commune, Buzău County
 Ceair, the old name of Răsurile village in Ileana Commune, Călărași County